Rotherham Masborough railway station was the main railway station for Rotherham, South Yorkshire, England from the 1840s until 1987, when most trains were rerouted via Rotherham Central. It had four platforms, with a large sandstone station building on the eastern Platform Four, large iron and glass platform canopies, a fully enclosed footbridge and wooden waiting rooms on the other platforms. It closed in 1988, except for a few football specials.

History
The station, designed by Francis Thompson, was opened by the North Midland Railway between Derby and Leeds, and named simply 'Masbrough', without the 'o', since Rotherham had not yet grown to surround the village. The station was renamed 'Masbrough & Rotherham' in 1896, 'Rotherham Masborough' in 1908 (misspelt by the railway company: the name of the district has always been 'Masbrough'), then simply 'Rotherham' in 1969.

The line was the first main link between Yorkshire and London, via Birmingham or Rugby. In time, it became part of the main line to London St Pancras and the South West. Initially, it omitted Sheffield, the region's main settlement, by following a route along the Rother Valley, thus avoiding the difficult terrain on the prospective route south of Sheffield.  At Masborough the line passed over the Sheffield & Rotherham Railway's Sheffield Wicker to Rotherham Westgate Station line and a large triangle junction was built allowing trains from the north and North Midland trains to travel into Sheffield from the north-east along the Don Valley. Immediately to the north of this junction stood Rotherham Masborough station.

In the 1870, Sheffield was finally linked with Chesterfield, allowing Midland Main Line trains to call at the newly opened Sheffield railway station on their way north, passing back on to North Midland metals via the Sheffield & Rotherham.

As late as the 1940s some long-distance passenger trains still used the original Chesterfield - Rotherham old road, avoiding Sheffield and calling at Rotherham. Other ex-London expresses would slip a coach at Rotherham until this practice was discontinued nationally from the 1930s onwards. The corresponding up working would involve the coaches being worked to Sheffield by a local train and attached to a London express there.  Up until the 1980s the odd London-Leeds express train would call at Masborough.

During the 1960s rationalisation of railways, Rotherham Masborough became Rotherham's only station and eventually lost its 'Masborough' suffix.

Short-sighted track and signalling rationalisation in the late 1970s meant that platforms 3 and 4 could not be used by Sheffield-bound trains without reversing, which made them effectively useless and removed much operational flexibility on the line as express trains could no longer easily pass/overtake local trains at Rotherham.

By the 1980s railways in South Yorkshire were in a sorry state having lost most of their passengers. Rotherham in particular suffered from its remaining station being, at the time, just under half-a-mile from the town centre. As a result, a link was built from the former Sheffield & Rotherham Line nearby at Holmes, to the Great Central Railway line, allowing local trains to use a re-opened Rotherham Central station, at the same time reintroducing the flexibility for expresses to pass local trains that had been removed a few years earlier. Rotherham Masborough regained its suffix in the timetables (though not on the station signboards) and soldiered on for a few years with Sheffield-York trains stopping until eventual closure on 3 October 1988. Most of the station buildings, awnings and footbridge were demolished in the early 1990s but the platforms still remain, and the line through the station is still used by express and freight services. The main station building on the east side has been converted into an Indian restaurant.

Stationmasters

Mr. Thackrah ca. 1846
W. Harrison until 1859
P. Turner 1859 - 1869
H.J. Brown ca. 1871 - 1874
W.T. Sykes 1874 - 1876 
Henry P. Jeffries 1876 - 1898
William Mee 1898 - 1913
John William Palmer 1914 - 1924 (afterwards station master at Bradford)
T. Hudson until 1929 (afterwards station master at Leek)
William Clements 1929 - 1939 (formerly station master at Apperley Bridge and Rawdon)

Services

References

External links
 Selection of photographs

Disused railway stations in Rotherham
Former Midland Railway stations
Railway stations in Great Britain opened in 1840
Railway stations in Great Britain closed in 1988
Francis Thompson railway stations